

Personal 

Nafisa Abu Bakr al-Malik (Arabicنفيسة ابو بكر المليك  ) born in 1932 in Rufa'a, Sudan, due to her father's frequent transfers she received her education in Rufa'a, Port Sudan and Khartoum North and completed her intermediate education in Omdurman international school of girls.

A Sudanese educator and one of the pioneer women in education in the colonial period, Almalik is a political figure and a trained teacher by profession.

Work 
Al-malik was one of the founders of  Union of Sudanese Women Teachers in 1949, and her name was listed as a member when the union held its second general conference on 24 April 1952.  

She joined primary school service after graduation from teachers training college. In 1947 she took the qualifying course in intermediate teacher school for girls, she joined the teacher training college as a school mistress and became headmistress of after her father's death in 1969.

Political activity

References

20th-century Sudanese women politicians
20th-century Sudanese politicians
1932 births
Living people
Sudanese educators